A number of coastal fortifications were built in County Cork, Ireland, to defend the county's coastline, and in particular the strategic berths at Cork Harbour, Kinsale Harbour, Berehaven and Bantry Bay. The fortifications initially included medieval tower houses built to defend strategic points (14th-17th centuries), subsequent Martello towers designed to counter threatened French invasion (18th-19th centuries), and later Palmerston Forts to further improve coastal defence (19th century). The latter were subsequently updated with longer-range coastal artillery - to support the naval defence of the "Western Approaches" during the First World War (early 20th century).

Cork Harbour
As one of the world's largest natural harbours, Cork Harbour's defences were built from medieval times up to the 20th century to defend the Port of Cork, Haulbowline naval yards, and Naval Air Station at Queenstown. Some of these defences were tested during the Siege of Cork (1690) and Fenian Rising (1867) - the harbour remains the home-port of the Irish Naval Service.

Kinsale Harbour and approaches
From medieval times, the harbour and berths at Kinsale were of strategic importance, and its defences were tested during the Battle of Kinsale (1601) and Williamite War (1690). Though declining in importance (relative to those at Cork Harbour) in the 18th and 19th centuries, several structures were in use until they were burned during the Irish Civil War (1922).

Bantry Bay and Berehaven Harbour
The deep-water berths at Bantry Bay and Berehaven Harbour were important from as early as the Nine Years' War and Siege of Dunboy in 1602, through the United Irishmen Rebellion and French Armada landings in the 1790s. The defences remained critical to support the Bantry Bay (anti-submarine) Naval Air Station during World War 1, and Berehaven "Treaty Port" was used by the Royal Navy fleet until it was relinquished in 1938 under the terms of the Anglo-Irish Treaty.

Baltimore and Roaring Water Bay
The defences at Baltimore, Roaring Water Bay and surrounding islands were largely built by landed families from the 14th to 17th centuries. Some were relinquished (but later returned) after the Nine Years' War (1603) and involved in the Sack of Baltimore (1631).

See also
 Coastal fortifications of Jersey
 Coastal fortifications of Malta
 Coastal fortifications of New Zealand
 Coastal fortifications of the United States
 List of castles in Ireland
 List of National Monuments in County Cork
 Martello towers in the Greater Dublin Area

References

Coastal fortifications
Coastal fortifications
~